Adolf Vinnen was a weather ship that was built in 1929 as the fishing vessel Gustav Adolf Kühling. She was renamed in 1930.

Description
She was powered by a triple expansion steam engine rated at 65 nhp. The engine was built by Deutsche Schiff- und Maschinenbau (Deschimag), Wesermünde.

History
Gustav Adolf Kühling was built by Deschimag as yard number 498 in 1929 for the Hochseefisherei J Wieting AG, Wesermünde. Launched in June 1929, she completed her sea trials on 7 October and was delivered the next day. Her port of registry was Bremerhaven. The Code Letters QVNK and fishing registration BX 208 were allocated. She was operated under the management of the Deutsche Hochseefisherei Bremen-Cuxhaven AG. On 16 June 1930, she was sold to the Deutsche Hochseefischerei Bremen-Cuxhaven AG. Her port of registry was changed to Nordenham and the fishing registration ON 141 was allocated. On 24 October, she was renamed Adolf Vinnen.

With the change of Code Letters on 1 January 1934, she was allocated the letters DNOQ. On 4 September, her port of registry was changed to Wesermünde and the fishing registration PG 478 was allocated. On 17 October, she was sold to the Deutsche Hochseefisherei Bremen-Cuxhaven AG.

In 1940, Adolf Vinnen was requisitioned by the Kriegsmarine and converted to a weather ship. She had a crew of fifteen, plus her meteorologists. She was commissioned on 1 March. From 1 March to mid-April, she operated in the Denmark Strait in support of the auxiliary cruiser , which was to escape into the Atlantic Ocean. Weather ships  and  also supplied Atlantis with weather reports. She arrived at Bergen, Norway on 14 April.

On 5 May 1940, she sailed from Bergen disguised as a Belgian vessel. Her destination was an area north east of Iceland where she was to operate in support of the auxiliary cruiser . Her first weather report was sent on 10 May. She was relieved on 25 May by Hinrich Freese. On 4 June, she collided with an iceberg. As she had not been overhauled for over a year, it was decided that she would return to Germany for repairs, which would take three weeks to perform. She sailed from Bergen in a convoy of five ships on 9 June, bound for Kristiansand. Following repairs, she returned to Bergen on 14 July. Adolf Vinnen sailed two days later to relieve Fritz Homann east of Iceland. On 18 July, it was decided that the three weather ships were to be withdrawn, but the order was rescinded the next day. She was relieved on 18 August by Hinrich Freese.

Adolf Vinnen was then placed under repair at Bergen, with  having priority over her. She departed from Bergen on 22 September to operate north of Iceland. She was recalled after four weeks and headed back to Norway. Six of her crew were killed and seven survivors took to the life raft.

References

1929 ships
Ships built in Bremen (state)
Fishing vessels of Germany
World War II auxiliary ships of Germany
Weather ships
Maritime incidents in October 1940
World War II shipwrecks in the Norwegian Sea